The 1980 La Flèche Wallonne was the 44th edition of La Flèche Wallonne cycle race and was held on 17 April 1980. The race started in Mons and finished in Spa. The race was won by Giuseppe Saronni of the Gis Gelati team.

General classification

References

1980 in road cycling
1980
1980 in Belgian sport
1980 Super Prestige Pernod